The discography of James Taylor, an American singer-songwriter, consists of 20 studio albums, six compilation albums, at least five live albums, one tribute album, nine video albums, one extended play, and 40 singles.

Taylor signed his first recording contract with Apple Records, where he released his self-titled debut album in 1969. Prior to signing with Apple, Taylor released the single "Night Owl" with the group The Flying Machine. An album of their recordings, James Taylor and the Original Flying Machine was released in 1971 and reached No. 74 on the US pop charts. Taylor released his second studio album Sweet Baby James on Warner Bros. Records in 1970. Its lead single "Fire and Rain" became a significant international hit and gained Taylor his first major exposure as an artist. In April 1971, Taylor released his third studio album Mud Slide Slim and the Blue Horizon, which became his second album to certify multi-platinum in sales by the Recording Industry Association of America and featured his first number one single "You've Got a Friend". In 1972 and 1973, he released his fourth studio album, One Man Dog and his fifth, Walking Man; both peaked within the Top 20 on the Billboard 200 albums list.

After releasing more albums between 1974 and 1976, Taylor signed with Columbia Records and issued JT in 1977, which peaked in the Top 5 and sold over two million copies in the United States, certifying two times multi-platinum by the Recording Industry Association of America. In 1979 and 1981, Taylor released Flag and Dad Loves His Work, respectively, which both certified platinum in the United States and produced Top 40 singles. Nearly four years later, Taylor's next studio album That's Why I'm Here was released and spawned a cover of Buddy Holly's "Everyday", which became a minor hit in the United States. This was followed by Never Die Young three years later and then by New Moon Shine in 1991, both of which sold over one million copies. After recording a two-disc live album in 1993, Taylor returned in 1997 with a fourteenth studio album titled Hourglass. The album not only peaked at No. 9 on the Billboard 200, but also received a Grammy Award for Best Pop Album the following year. His fifteenth studio release October Road was issued on August 13, 2002, on Sony BMG and certified platinum by the Recording Industry Association of America. After recording a limited release holiday album in 2004, Taylor released his first major-release holiday album, James Taylor at Christmas on October 10, 2006.

One Man Band was released in 2007 and certified gold in the United States. This was followed by Taylor's first cover album in 2008 on the Hear Music label. There was also an extended play sequel, Other Covers in 2009. In 2015, Taylor released another live album, Georgia on My Mind: Live in Atlanta, 1981, and another studio album, Before This World, which became the first Taylor's album to peak at No.1 in the United States.

Studio albums

1960s

1970s

1980s

1990s

2000s–2020s

Live albums

Compilation albums

Extended plays

Singles 

A^ "Everyday" also peaked at No. 21 on the Canadian RPM Country Tracks chart.

Guest singles

Other charted songs

Other appearances

Guest and session appearances

Video albums

Music videos

References

Discography
Discographies of American artists
Folk music discographies
Rock music discographies